John Pellisier (25 April 1703 – 6 January 1781) was an Irish academic.

Pellisier was born in Clonygowan and educated at Trinity College Dublin. He became a Fellow of TCD in 1727 and Regius Professor of Divinity there in 1746. In 1752 he became Rector of Ardstraw.

References
	

18th-century Irish Anglican priests
Alumni of Trinity College Dublin
Academics of Trinity College Dublin
1703 births
1781 deaths
Regius Professors of Divinity (University of Dublin)
People from County Offaly